The 2022–23 season is the 118th season in the existence of Carlisle United Football Club and the club's ninth consecutive season in League Two. In addition to the league, they will also compete in the 2022–23 FA Cup, the 2022–23 EFL Cup and the 2022–23 EFL Trophy.

Squad statistics

Transfers

In

Out

Loans in

Loans out

Pre-season and friendlies
On 13 May, Carlisle United announced the first three of their pre-season friendlies, against Penrith, Kendal Town and Workington Two more matches were added on 20 May. Two more friendlies against Bolton Wanderers and Morecambe were confirmed.

Mid-season

Competitions

Overall record

League Two

League table

Results summary

Results by round

Matches

On 23 June, the league fixtures were announced.

FA Cup

The Cumbrians were drawn at home to Tranmere Rovers in the first round and away to Walsall in the second round.

EFL Cup

Carlisle were drawn away to Shrewsbury Town in the first round.

EFL Trophy

On 20 June, the initial Group stage draw was made, grouping Carlisle United with Barrow and Fleetwood Town. Three days later, Manchester United U21s joined Northern Group G.

References

Carlisle United
Carlisle United F.C. seasons
English football clubs 2022–23 season